West End is an unincorporated community in Moore County, North Carolina, United States. The community is located at the multiplex of two primary state highways, North Carolina Highway 211 (NC 211) and North Carolina Highway 73 (NC 73). It is named for when it was the western terminus of a railroad from Aberdeen, from about 1890–1898.

History
Founded in 1890 when the Aberdeen & Star Railroad constructed a rail line from Aberdeen. Soon after re-organized as Aberdeen & West End Railroad, the rail line was extended in 1898 to Eagle Springs; today it is part of the Aberdeen, Carolina and Western Railway. The West End Post Office was also established in 1890 and continues to operate and provide rural letter carrier service for the area.

In 2001, Stanley Furniture closed its West End plant, eliminating a work force of 400 jobs. In 2019, the facility was razed to make way for the widening of NC 211 into a four-lane divided boulevard.

See also
 Moore County substation attack

References

Unincorporated communities in Moore County, North Carolina
Unincorporated communities in North Carolina
Populated places established in 1890